Nadine Auzeil-Schoellkopf (born 19 August 1964 in Barr, Bas-Rhin) is a retired female javelin thrower from France. A three-time Olympian she set her personal best (62.16 metres) on 27 June 2000 in Strasbourg.

Her son, Bastien Auzeil, is a decathlete.

International competitions

References

sports-reference

1964 births
Living people
People from Barr, Bas-Rhin
French female javelin throwers
Athletes (track and field) at the 1988 Summer Olympics
Athletes (track and field) at the 1996 Summer Olympics
Athletes (track and field) at the 2000 Summer Olympics
Olympic athletes of France
World Athletics Championships athletes for France
Mediterranean Games gold medalists for France
Mediterranean Games silver medalists for France
Mediterranean Games bronze medalists for France
Mediterranean Games medalists in athletics
Athletes (track and field) at the 1983 Mediterranean Games
Athletes (track and field) at the 1991 Mediterranean Games
Athletes (track and field) at the 1993 Mediterranean Games
Athletes (track and field) at the 1997 Mediterranean Games
Competitors at the 1987 Summer Universiade
Sportspeople from Bas-Rhin
20th-century French women
21st-century French women